Joseph Nimmich was the Deputy Administrator of the Federal Emergency Management Agency (FEMA) from September 2014 to January 2017. Before becoming the Deputy Administrator, he was Associate Administrator for the Office of Response and Recovery at FEMA.  Nimmich received a master's degree in Business Administration from the Stern School of Business at New York University in 1988. He is also a graduate of the United States Army War College and the US Coast Guard Academy. Nimmich was commissioned as an ensign in 1977 and retired from the Coast Guard as a rear admiral in 2010.

References

1955 births
Living people
United States Coast Guard Academy alumni
New York University Stern School of Business alumni
United States Army War College alumni
United States Coast Guard admirals
Recipients of the Legion of Merit
Recipients of the Coast Guard Distinguished Service Medal
Federal Emergency Management Agency officials